Knaresborough railway station is a Grade II listed station serving the town of Knaresborough in North Yorkshire, England.

Location
The station is located at the northern side of the Knaresborough Viaduct off Station Road to the south-west side of Knaresborough town centre.  The station is within walking distance of the town centre and the western side of Knaresborough.

History

The East and West Yorkshire Junction Railway (E&WJR) was opened from York (Poppleton Junction) to a temporary terminus known as Hay Park Lane, Knaresborough on 30 October 1848. The E&WYJR was absorbed by the York and North Midland Railway on 1 July 1851. Three weeks later, with the completion of the stone viaduct crossing the River Nidd at Knaresborough on 21 July 1851, the temporary station was closed and a new Knaresborough station opened on the current site just beyond the stone viaduct.

In 1865 the North Eastern Railway replaced the 1851 station with a new one designed by Thomas Prosser. The station was rebuilt c.1890. The 1851 water tower is still extant.

Beyond the platforms eastbound was a tunnel which separated the station from the goods yard (now a bus depot) and the line's major junction.  The Knaresborough to Boroughbridge branch (1875–1950 for passengers, 1964 for goods) diverged from the main line to York opposite the goods yard.  This line continued north-east until it met the East Coast Main Line between York and Northallerton at Pilmoor. The tunnel is still extant with both north and south portals are now listed structures.

The station signal box (built 1890) is somewhat unusual in that it was built onto the end of an adjoining row of terraced houses on Kirkgate. It supervises the single line section eastwards to Cattal, an adjacent level crossing and a crossover that is used to reverse those trains from Leeds that terminate here.

Facilities 
The station is unstaffed, but has a single ticket machine available on platform 1.  The station buildings on the eastbound platform are in private commercial use – one of these is a cafe (sited in the old booking office) that is open to the public.  Both platforms have shelters and are linked by subway and the level crossing. Step-free access is via separate entrances to each platform.  A long-line P.A. system and passenger information screens are in place to provide train running details.

Future
On 5 March 2015, the Harrogate Line, amongst others in the area including the Leeds-Bradford Interchange-Halifax Line, the Selby-Hull Line and the Northallerton-Middlesbrough Line, were named top priority for electrification; the estimated cost for the Harrogate Line was £93 million, with a projected cost-benefit ratio of 1/1.80.  No impementation date has been set however.

Money has been set aside for the doubling of the single line sections between Knaresborough and York. This will allow capacity improvements along the whole line. The projected completion date for this work is 2018.

Services
During Monday to Saturday off-peak, there is a half-hourly service to Leeds (westbound) and an hourly service to York (eastbound).  Additional services run during weekday peak periods.

During evenings there is an hourly service in each direction, whilst on Sundays (from mid-morning) there are two trains per hour to Leeds and one to York.

References

External links
Griffith, Roger (2017) Video footage of Knaresborough railway station, YouTube

Railway stations in North Yorkshire
DfT Category F1 stations
Former York and North Midland Railway stations
Railway stations in Great Britain opened in 1848
Railway stations in Great Britain closed in 1851
Railway stations in Great Britain opened in 1851
Northern franchise railway stations
Knaresborough
1848 establishments in England
Thomas Prosser railway stations
Grade II listed buildings in North Yorkshire
Grade II listed railway stations